Notable Nigerian entrepreneurs, businesspeople of Nigerian nationality or with Nigerian citizenship.

 M. K. O. Abiola
 Mike Adenuga
 Taiwo Afolabi
 Ganiyu Akanbi Bello
 Demola Aladekomo
 Folorunsho Alakija
 Mahmood Ahmadu 
 Tonye Briggs-Oniyide
 Tonye Coleco-founder of Sahara Group
 Aliko DangoteChairman, Dangote Group
 Mr EaziSinger, songwriter, and entrepreneur
 Francis Edo-Osagie
 Godwin Maduka, Nigerian doctor, businessman, philanthropist and the founder of Las Vegas Pain Institute and Medical Center
 Shafi Edu
 Henry Fajemirokun
 Samuel Fawehinmi
 Cletus Ibeto
 Michael Ibru
 Linda Ikeji
 Anastasios George Leventis
 Dele MomoduCEO and Publisher, Ovation International
 Ben Murray-BruceChairman and Founder, The Silverbird Group
 Jason NjokuCEO, irokotv
 Genevieve Nnaji
 Mary Nzimiro (1898–1993), businesswoman, politician and women's activist
 Sunny Obazu-Ojeagbase
 Louis Odumegwu Ojukwu
 Adeola Odutola
 Stella Chinyelu Okoli
 Festus Okotie-Eboh
 Omu Okwei
 Ade Tuyo
 Lawrence Omole
 C. T. Onyekwelu
 Seun Osewa
 Bisoye Tejuoso
 Bamanga Tukur
 Mathias Ugochukwu
Femi Otedola
Jim Ovia 
Tony Elumelu 
Theophilus Danjuma 
Oba Otudeko 
Abdul Samad Rabiu 
Uzoma Dozie 
Funke Opeke 
Mohammed Indimi 
Dahiru Mangal
Iyinoluwa Aboyeji
Nnaemeka clinton
Don Jazzy
Chief E.O. Ashamu

References

Nigerian